Charmurti (The Four Heroes) is a Bengali comedy adventure film directed by Umanath Bhattacharya based on a Tenida novel of Narayan Gangopadhyay in the same name. This movie was released in 1978 in the banner of Mokshada Films.

Plot
After the examination Tenida decides to spend the holidays with his friends Kyabla, Habul, and Palaram. Kyabla's uncle suggests them to go to his bungalow inside a dense forest area at Jhantipahari, a small village near Ramgarh. The place was considered to be haunted with unnatural incidents. The four go to Jhantipahar and face mystery created by few unknown persons. They decide to investigate and it is found that a group of criminal are running a business of counterfeiting fake notes near the haunted bungalow.

Cast
 Chinmoy Roy as Tenida
 Rabi Ghosh as Seth Dhunduram
 Kajal Gupta as Kyabla's mother
 Santosh Dutta as Kyabla's uncle
 Biplab Chatterjee as Police officer
 Shambhu Bhattacharya as Gajeswar
 Satya Bandyopadhyay as Ghutghutananda
 Rita Sanyal
 Nimai Dutta
 Samaresh Banerjee

References

External links
 

1978 films
Indian children's films
Bengali-language Indian films
1970s adventure comedy films
Films based on Indian novels
Indian adventure comedy films
1970s Bengali-language films
1978 comedy films
Films based on works by Narayan Gangopadhyay